This is a list of artworks by Alexander Calder that are available to the public.

United States

California 

 The Hawk for Peace, 1968, Berkeley Art Museum and Pacific Film Archive, University of California, Berkeley
 Bucephalus, 1963, Saroyan Theatre, Fresno
 Three Quintains, 1964, Los Angeles County Museum of Art
 Four Arches, 1973, 333 S. Hope Street, Bunker Hill, Los Angeles
 Spinal Column, 1968, San Diego Museum of Art
 Le Faucon (The Falcon), 1963, Stanford University, Palo Alto
 Button Flower, 1959, University of California, Los Angeles
 Big Crinkly, 1969, San Francisco Museum of Modern Art
 Jerusalem Stabile, 1967, On loan to the Huntington Library, Art Collections and Botanical Gardens, San Marino
  Spiny Top, Curly Bottom, 1963, J. Paul Getty Museum, Los Angeles
  The Jousters, 1963, J. Paul Getty Museum, Los Angeles

Connecticut 

 Stegosaurus, 1973, Alfred E. Burr Mall, Hartford
 Gallows and Lollipops, 1960, Yale University Art Gallery, New Haven
 Mountains, 1976, Minor Library, Roxbury

Georgia 

 Three Up, Three Down, 1973, High Museum of Art, Atlanta

Illinois 

 Flamingo, 1974, Federal Center Plaza, Chicago
 Universe, 1974, Sears Tower, Chicago
 Flying Dragon, 1975, Sculpture Garden, Art Institute of Chicago
 Le Baron, 1965, Northern Illinois University, De Kalb

Indiana 

 Peau Rouge Indiana, 1970, Musical Arts Center, Indiana University Bloomington

Iowa 

 Black Spread, 1951, Des Moines Art Center,
 Holy Red, 1960, Des Moines Art Center,

Kansas 

 Eléments Démontables, 1975, Bank of America Financial Center, 100 North Broadway Street, Wichita

Kentucky 

 The Red Feather, 1975, The Kentucky Center, Louisville

Maryland 

 Four Dishes, 1967, Baltimore Museum of Art
 The 100 Yard Dash, 1969, Baltimore Museum of Art

Massachusetts 

 La Grande Voile (The Big Sail), 1965, MIT, Cambridge
 La Grande Voile (The Big Sail), intermediate maquette, 1965, List Visual Arts Center, MIT, Cambridge
 Onion 1965, Harvard Yard, Harvard, Cambridge

Michigan 

 Jeune fille et sa suite (Young Woman and Her Suitors), 1970, Detroit Institute of Arts
 The X and Its Tails, 1967, College of Creative Studies, Detroit
 Deux Disques (Two Discs), 1965, Frederik Meijer Gardens & Sculpture Park (Long-term loan from Smithsonian Institution), Grand Rapids 
 A Two-Faced Guy, 1969, Frederik Meijer Gardens & Sculpture Park (Long-term loan from Smithsonian Institution), Grand Rapids
 La Grande Vitesse, 1969, Vandenberg Plaza, Grand Rapids
 Rooftop painting, Kent County Administration Building, Grand Rapids
 La Grande vitesse [intermediate maquette], 1969, Grand Rapids Art Museum
 4 Planes in Space, c. 1955, Grand Rapids Art Museum 
 Mobile 1, 1953 Grosse Pointe Public Library, Grosse Pointe Farms

Minnesota 

 The Spinner, 1966, Walker Art Center, Minneapolis
 Octopus, 1964, Walker Art Center, Minneapolis
 Red, Yellow, White, 1961, Minneapolis Central Library
 Ahab, 1953, Minneapolis Institute of Art

Missouri 

 Shiva, 1965, Crown Center, Kansas City
 Tom's Cubicle, 1967, Nelson-Atkins Museum of Art, Kansas City
 Five Rudders, 1965, Mildred Lane Kemper Art Museum, Washington University in St. Louis
 Le Bonnet phrygien, 1963, Saint Louis Art Museum, St. Louis

New Jersey 

 Hard to Swallow, 1966, S.C. Williams Library, Stevens Institute of Technology, Hoboken
 The Stevens Mobile, 1970,  S.C. Williams Library, Stevens Institute of Technology, Hoboken
 Five Discs, One Empty, 1970, Princeton University Art Museum
 El Sol Rojo, intermediate maquette, 1968, The New Jersey State Museum, Trenton

New York 

 Triangles and Arches, 1965, Empire State Plaza, Albany
 The Arch, 1975, Storm King Art Center, Mountainville
 Janey Waney, 1969, Gramercy Park, New York City (formerly on display at Smith Haven Mall, Lake Grove, New York)
 Object in Five Planes, 1965, Federal Plaza, New York City
 .125, 1957, International Terminal 4, John F. Kennedy International Airport, New York City 
 Le Guichet (The Ticket Window), 1963, Lincoln Center for the Performing Arts, New York City 
 Saurien, 1975, IBM building, New York City
 Man-Eater with Pennants, mobile, 1945, Sculpture Garden at Museum of Modern Art, New York City
Black Widow, stabile, 1959, Sculpture Garden at Museum of Modern Art, New York City
 Sandy's Butterfly, stabile/mobile, 1964, Sculpture Garden at Museum of Modern Art, New York City
 Whale II, 1964 (1937), Sculpture Garden at Museum of Modern Art, New York City
 Sidewalk Design, 1970, 1014-1018 Madison Avenue, New York City
 World Trade Center Stabile (Bent Propeller), [destroyed in the terrorist attacks of September 11, 2001] 1970-71, 7 World Trade Center, New York City
 Untitled, 1976, 11 Howard Hotel, New York City
 Large Spiny, 1966, Pocantico Hills Estate, Tarrytown
 Hats Off, 1969, Donald M. Kendall Sculpture Gardens at PepsiCo, Purchase
 Three Arches, 1963, Munson-Williams-Proctor Institute, Museum of Art, Utica

Ohio

 Intermediate Model for the Arch, 1975, sculpture garden at the Columbus Museum of Art
 Stegosaurus, intermediate maquette, 1972-1973, entrance of Toledo Museum of Art
 Twenty Leaves and an Apple, 1948, a mobile installed in the lobby of the Terrace Plaza Hotel, currently in the Cincinnati Art Museum

Oklahoma

 Caracas, 1955, third floor, Oklahoma City Museum of Art, Oklahoma City

Pennsylvania 

 Mobile, 1941, The Carnegie Museum of Art, Pittsburgh
 Jerusalem Stabile, intermediate maquette, Meyerson Hall, University of Pennsylvania, Philadelphia
 The Ghost, 1964, Philadelphia Museum of Art
 White Cascade, 1975, Federal Reserve Bank of Philadelphia
 Three Discs, One Lacking, 1968, Pennwalt/Levy Park, Philadelphia
 Pittsburgh, Pennsylvania|Pittsburgh, 1958, Pittsburgh International Airport
 Back from Rio, 1959, in front of the Science Center, Swarthmore College, Swarthmore

Tennessee

 Pregnant Whale, 1963, in front of the Hunter Museum of American Art, Chattanooga
 Nenuphar (Water Lily), 1968, Memphis Brooks Museum of Art, Memphis

Texas

 Three Bollards (Trois Bollards), 1970, Nasher Sculpture Center, Dallas
 The Crab, 1962, Museum of Fine Arts, Houston
 International Mobile, 1949, Museum of Fine Arts, Houston

Washington 

 Eagle, 1971, Olympic Sculpture Park, Seattle

Washington, D.C. 

 Finny Fish, 1948, National Gallery of Art
 Cascading Flowers, mobile, 1949, National Gallery of Art
 Aztec Josephine Baker, 1929, National Gallery of Art
 Mountains and Clouds, 1976–87, Hart Senate Office Building
 Six Dots Over a Mountain, 1956, Hirshhorn Museum and Sculpture Garden, Smithsonian Institution
 Deux Disques (Two Discs), 1965, Hirshhorn Museum and Sculpture Garden, Smithsonian Institution, On loan to the Frederik Meijer Gardens in Grand Rapids, Michigan
 Untitled, mobile, 1976, National Gallery of Art
 Tom's, stabile, 1974, National Gallery of Art
 Cheval Rouge (Red Horse), 1974, National Gallery of Art Sculpture Garden
 Two Faced Guy, 1969, The Phillips Collection
 Gwenfritz, 1968, National Museum of American Art

Wisconsin 

 Red, Black, and Blue, 1968, Milwaukee Art Museum

Outside the United States

Australia 

 Bobine, 1970, National Gallery of Australia, Canberra
 Crossed Blades, 1967, Australia Square Tower, Sydney

Belgium

 The Dog, stabile, 1958, Middelheim Open Air Sculpture Museum, Antwerp
  The Whirling Ear, stabile/mobile, 1957, Royal Museums of Fine Arts of Belgium, Brussels

Canada

 Man, 1967, Montreal
 Man (intermediate maquette), 1967, York University Art Gallery, Toronto

Denmark 

 Nervures Minces (Slender Ribs), stabile, 1963, Sculpture Garden, Louisiana Museum of Modern Art, Humlebæk
 Little Janey Waney, stabile/mobile, 1976 (1964), Sculpture Garden, Louisiana Museum of Modern Art, Humlebæk
 Almost Snow Plow, stabile, 1976 (1964), Sculpture Garden, Louisiana Museum of Modern Art, Humlebæk

France 

 Crinkly, 1969, Corner of Rue du Clos des Gardes and Rue du 8 Mai 1945, Amboise
 Caliban, 1964, Musee Esteve, Bourges
 Monsieur Loyal (Mr. Loyal), 1967, Sculpture Park, Museum of Grenoble
 Trois pics (Three Peaks), 1967, Nouvelle Gare (Train Station), Grenoble
 La Cornue, 1974, Academie de Grenoble
 Small Crinkly, 1976, Château La Coste, Le Puy-Sainte-Réparade
 Théâtre de Nice, 1970, Theatre National de Nice
 L'araignée rouge (The Red Spider), 1976, Etablissement Public pour L'Aménagement de la Région de La Défense, Paris
 Nageoire (Fin), 1964, Musée National d'Art Moderne, Centre Pompidou, Paris
 Horizontal, 1974, Musée National d'Art Moderne, Centre Pompidou, Paris
 La Spirale, 1958, UNESCO building, Paris
 Les ailes brisées (The Broken Wings), 1967, Saint Exupery College, Perpignan
 Totem-Saché, 1974, In front of the church, Saché, Indre-et-Loire
 Les trois ailes (The Three Wings), 1963, Musée d'art Moderne, Saint-Etienne
 Les Renforts (The Reinforcements), 1963, Fondation Maeght, Saint-Paul-de-Vence
 Empennage (Airplane Tail), 1953, Fondation Maeght, Saint-Paul-de-Vence
 Guillotine pour huit (Guillotine for Eight), stabile,1963, Lille Métropole Museum of Modern, Contemporary and Outsider Art, Villeneuve-d'Ascq
 Reims, la croix du sud (Southern Cross of Reims), stabile/mobile, 1969, Lille Métropole Museum of Modern, Contemporary and Outsider Art, Villeneuve d'Ascq
 stabile à l'IUT de Tours, site Jean Luthier 1973 https://patrimoine.univ-tours.fr/le-stabile-dalexander-calder-a-liut-site-jean-luthier-1973

Germany 

 Têtes et queue (Heads and Tail), 1965, Neue Nationalgalerie (New National Gallery), Berlin
 Les Triangles, 1963, Museum Ostwall, Dortmund
 Hextopus, 1955, American Consulate General, Frankfurt
 Le Hallebardier, 1971, Sprengel Museum, Hannover
 Pointes et Courbes (Points and Curves), 1970, Abteiberg Museum, Mönchengladbach
 Cinq Pics, 1972, Insel Hombroich, Neuss
 Crinkly with a Red Disc, 1973, Schlossplatz, Stuttgart

Italy 

 Teodelapio, stabile, 1962, City of Spoleto
 Sabot, stabile, 1963, Sculpture Garden, Peggy Guggenheim Collection, Venice

Ireland 

 Cactus provisoire, 1967, Trinity College Dublin

Israel 

 Homage to Jerusalem, 1977, Jerusalem
 The Cow, 1977, Jerusalem Foundation Community Center
 The Sun at Croton, 1960; Untitled, 1967, Israel Museum, Jerusalem

Japan 

 Les Arétes de poisson (The Fish Bones), 1966, Hakone Open-Air Museum, Kanagawa
 Fafnir-Dragon II, 1969, Nagoya City Art Museum
 Flamingo (intermediate maquette), 1973, The Museum of Modern Art, Otsu

Mexico 

 El Sol Rojo, 1968, Aztec Stadium, Mexico City

The Netherlands 

 Le Tamanoir (Anteater), 1963, borough of Hoogvliet, Rotterdam
 Mobile XII.V - III.H, 1955, Stedelijk Museum, Amsterdam

Portugal 

 Untitled, 1968, Belém Cultural Center, Lisbon

South Korea 

 Grand Crinkly, 1971, Ho-am Art Museum, Seoul

Spain 

 Quatre ailes (Four Wings), 1972, Fundació Joan Miró, Barcelona
 Nancy, 1972, S'Hort del Rei Palma de Mallorca
 Mercury Fountain, 1937, Fundació Joan Miró, Barcelona (for the World Fair in Paris)
 Carmen, 1974, Central Patio, Museo Reina Sofia, Madrid

Sweden 

 Three Wings, 1963, City of Gothenburg
 The Four Elements, 1938/1961, Moderna Museet, Stockholm
 L'un des notres, 1968, Fäladsgården, Lund

Switzerland 

 The Tree, 1966, Fondation Beyeler, Basel
 Big Spider, 1959, Kunstmuseum Basel 
 Brasilia, 1965, Fondation Pierre Gianadda, Martigny
 Stabile, 1963, The Nestle Art Collection, Vevey

Venezuela 

 Mobile, 1950, Villa Planchart - Anala & Armando Planchart Fondation, Caracas
 Red África, 1955, Museo de Bellas Artes, Caracas
 Stabile with horizontal blade, 1953, Universidad Central de Venezuela, Caracas
 Aula Magna (Floating Clouds), 1954, Universidad Central de Venezuela, Caracas
 Estalagmite, 1955, Universidad Central de Venezuela, Caracas
 Snow flurry, 1955, Universidad Central de Venezuela, Caracas
 The Devil's Chair, 1955, Caoma House, Fondation Villanueva Caracas
 Móbile, 1955, Caoma House, Fondation Villanueva Caracas
 The City, 1960, Museo de Bellas Artes, Caracas
 Broken Faces, 1960, Caracas Museum of Contemporary Art, Caracas

References 

Getty Museum Website, Spiny Top Curly Bottom and The Jousters

Lists of works of art